Jorge Fernando dos Santos Silva (born 22 March 1996) is a Portuguese professional footballer who plays for F.C. Paços de Ferreira as a right-back.

Club career
Born in Porto, Silva finished his development at Sporting CP. He made his senior debut with their reserves in the LigaPro on 23 January 2016, playing the entire 3–0 away loss against S.C. Farense.

Silva signed with Leixões S.C. of the same league on 17 June 2016. During his spell at the Estádio do Mar he appeared in an average of 28 league matches, being sent off in the 0–1 home defeat to Académico de Viseu F.C. on 30 October 2016.

On 1 July 2019, Silva joined Primeira Liga club F.C. Paços de Ferreira on a three-year contract. He played his first game in the competition on 4 November, as a second-half substitute in the 1–0 loss at Belenenses SAD.

Silva missed the vast majority of the 2020–21 season, due to injury.

References

External links

Portuguese League profile 

1996 births
Living people
Portuguese footballers
Footballers from Porto
Association football defenders
Primeira Liga players
Liga Portugal 2 players
Sporting CP B players
Leixões S.C. players
F.C. Paços de Ferreira players
Portugal youth international footballers